Parnell L. Woods (February 16, 1912 – July 22, 1977) was an American third baseman in Negro league baseball. He played between 1937 and 1949.

References

External links
 and Baseball-Reference Black Baseball stats and Seamheads
  and Seamheads

1912 births
1977 deaths
African-American baseball players
Birmingham Black Barons players
Cleveland Bears players
Cleveland Buckeyes players
Jacksonville Red Caps players
Louisville Buckeyes players
Oakland Oaks (baseball) players
Patriotas de Venezuela players
Baseball players from Birmingham, Alabama
20th-century African-American sportspeople